Potassium citrate/potassium hydrogencarbonate is a fixed-dose combination medication intended for the treatment of distal renal tubular acidosis. It contains potassium citrate and potassium hydrogencarbonate.

Potassium citrate/potassium hydrogencarbonate was approved for medical use in the European Union in April 2021.

Medical uses 
Potassium citrate/potassium hydrogencarbonate is indicated for the treatment of distal renal tubular acidosis (dRTA) in people aged one year and older.

History 
On 10 December 2020, the Committee for Medicinal Products for Human Use (CHMP) of the European Medicines Agency (EMA) adopted a positive opinion, recommending the granting of a marketing authorization for the medicinal product Sibnayal. The applicant for this medicinal product is Advicenne S.A. Potassium citrate/potassium hydrogencarbonate was approved for medical use in the European Union in April 2021.

Potassium citrate/potassium hydrogencarbonate is recommended for approval in the United Kingdom.

Research 
Potassium citrate/potassium hydrogencarbonate is undergoing Phase III trials in preparation for evaluation by the U.S. Food and Drug Administration (FDA).

References

External links 
 
 

Combination drugs